Jack Nasher (born Jack Lord Nasher-Awakemian; 1 June 1979) is a German author, negotiation advisor, and a professor at Munich Business School.

Early life and education 
Nasher has Armenian and Afghan roots, and is a member of the Nasher clan.

Nasher went to school in Germany, France, and in the United States.
He received a master's degree in Philosophy and Psychology at Trier University. He graduated with law degree from Frankfurt University, received  a master's degree in management studies from Oxford University; and was a Research Associate of Holywell Manor, Oxford,. He completed a doctorate in philosophy at Vienna University. Nasher concluded his legal training at the European Court of Justice, at the European Parliament, and at the law firm Skadden, Arps, Slate, Meagher & Flom. and at the German mission to the United Nations in New York City.

Career

Teaching 
Nasher started his teaching career as a tutor at Oxford University, where he also conducted interviews for prospective students, before being appointed Professor for Leadership and Organization at Munich Business School in 2010.
At the time of his appointment, he was the youngest professor in the state of Bavaria. He is a visiting faculty of the Bing Overseas Studies Program at Stanford University

Works 

Nasher mostly applies psychological concepts in order to assess and influence individuals, mostly in the context of negotiations. He is a contributor for Forbes and authors the annual Top 10 list of "World Changing Negotiations". Nasher's books reached were published in the USA, the United Kingdom, Australia, India, Germany, Austria, Switzerland, Poland, Czech Republic, Korea, Russia, Taiwan, Japan, Mexico and China.

Nasher's work has been covered in publications such as The Wall Street Journal, ZEIT, Fast Company, Inc. and Forbes.

Deal! Frankfurt/New York: Campus 2013,  reached multiple bestselling status in Germany, became one of Germany's best selling business books of the year and was considered one of the best career books of the year. It was subsequently published in Russia, Korea, Taiwan, China, Japan, Austria and in Switzerland.
CONVINCED! How to Prove Your Competence and Win People Over. Berrett-Koehler 2018,  was published in Germany, Austria, Switzerland, China, Korea, Russia, Poland, Mexico, the USA, Canada, India, the United Kingdom, and Australia.
 Durchschaut! Das Geheimnis, kleine und große Lügen zu entlarven. Random House 2010,  also published in China, Korea, Taiwan, Poland, Czech Republic, Austria and Switzerland.

Awards and memberships 
In 2016, Nasher received the Gold Medal for best paper at the International Conference on Applied Psychology in Colombo/Sri Lanka
Full member,  Society of Personality & Social Psychology
Principle Practitioner, Association of Business Psychologists

Philanthropy 
Nasher donated his royalties from his book publication on Karl Popper's Open Society ("Die Staatstheorie Karl Poppers") to Human Rights Watch, a nonprofit, nongovernmental organization.

Trivia 
Nasher is an avid mentalist and regularly performs at The Magic Castle in Hollywood, California. He has performed in the show Manhattan Magic on Times Square in New York City in 2009., and was a participant in the German TV-Show The next Uri Geller.

Nasher acted as a co-executive producer for the British gangster movie "The Smoke"
that was introduced at the Marbella International Film Festival.

He is a cousin of the Afghan singer Farhad Darya.

Conferences 
What Makes Leaders Look Great? Actual and Perceived Competence of Leaders; interactive poster presented at the 42nd Annual Conference of the European International Business Academy (EIBA), 2–5 December 2016, Vienna/Austria.
 The Art of Showing Expertise, CECE Congress "Industry in Transformation. Drivers of Success"; 5–7 October 2016, Prague/Czech Republic
Casting a Brick for a Jade, 6th International Biennial on Negotiation, 16–18 November, Paris/France
The Impression of Competence, International Conference on Applied Psychology, 26–28 August 2016, Colombo/Sri Lanka.
 The Norm of Reciprocity Revisited, 11th Global Research Symposium, 15–17 June 2016, Rome/Italy.

References

External links 
 
 Munich Business School Faculty Page

1979 births
Living people
People from Korbach
German psychologists